Nina Johnsen is a Norwegian former professional racing cyclist. She won the Norwegian National Road Race Championship in 1982.

References

External links

Year of birth missing (living people)
Living people
Norwegian female cyclists
Place of birth missing (living people)